Aghstafa District is one of the 66 districts of Azerbaijan. It is located in the north-west of the country and belongs to the Gazakh-Tovuz Economic Region. The district borders the districts of Qazakh, Tovuz, as well as the Kakheti and Kvemo Kartli regions of Georgia. Its capital and largest city is Aghstafa. As of 2020, the district had a population of 88,500.

Overview 
Aghstafa District was created on 24 January 1939 as an independent administrative unit out of the larger Qazakh region of Azerbaijan. On 4 December 1959, the status of the district was abolished and it was incorporated into Qazakh District. On 14 April 1990, by the decree of the Council of Deputies of Azerbaijan SSR, it was split from Qazakh District and was again re-established as a separate district. The regional center of the district is its capital
Aghstafa. The district is located in the northwestern part of the country, between Qabirri basin and Lesser Caucasus mountain range, and Ganja-Gazakh
lowlands and Ceyrançöl highlands. It is sandwiched by Qazakh District in the west and Tovuz District in east, and borders Armenia on the southern frontier and Georgia on the northern.
The area of the district is 1,503.7 km2. There are 36 villages in the district. There are 39 secondary schools, lyceum, musical school, 2 museums, 38 cultural clubs, State Arts Gallery, 49 libraries, 3 city and 10 village hospitals functioning in the district. Ganja, Qazakh and Qarayazi lowlands make up the most of the district's area, whilst its southwestern and northeastern parts comprise lesser mountain sites.

Etymology 
The area's name comes from the name of the Oghuz Turks which include mainly the population of Azerbaijan, Turkey and Turkmenistan.
Ağstafa is a merger of two words: Oğuz + tayfa (Oghuz + tribe). However, some people argue that it is a merger of the other two words which are: Oğuz + təpə (Oghuz + hill).

Economy
The region is rich with bentonite, sand, raw cement material (volcanic ash) and other resources which are considered a core of the Aghstafa economy. The Kura River passes through the region. Lower sections of Aghstafa and Həsənsu rivers also flow through the district. Aghstafa has always been in the spotlight because of the historic Silk Way trade which went through the region. Caravans from and to Georgia and Iran would stop in Aghstafa. It was therefore named the "Camel route". In the 1990s, the caravan route was re-established within the TRACECA project initiated by Heydar Aliyev administration. Then Aghstafa gained importance when it became a transit route on the Baku-Tbilisi railroad built in 1881. A railroad junction at Aghstafa was built in 1914 thus creating leading to construction of Aghstafa city. In addition to the existing railway, the geostrategic importance of Aghstafa was enriched by Baku-Gazakh-Tbilisi gas pipeline, Baku–Tbilisi–Ceyhan pipeline, Baku-Tbilisi-Erzurum gas pipeline.

During the first nine months of 2013, the cost of total product output in Aghstafa region was AZN 90.9 million, an increase of 8.0 percent in comparison with the same period last year. During the first 9 months of 2017, total volume of total product output on the region of Aghstafa increased by 43.6 percent and reached 143.7 million manat. The total volume of industrial production increased by 38.3 percent, agriculture - by 0.9 percent, transport services - 3.3 percent, communication services - 4.3 percent, trade - 0.4 percent and construction - 3 times in comparison with the same period last year. The volume of investments directed to fixed assets increased 2.7 times and amounted to more than 68.7 million manat.

Demography
The population of Aghstafa district is 78,983. Mostly populated villages are Dağ Kəsəmən, Köçəsgər, Muğanlı and Aşağı
Kəsəmən and the town of Aghstafa. 
Azerbaijanis - 98.7%
Meskhetian Turks - 0.6%
 Other - 0.7%

Population 
The territory of Aghstafa district is 1504 km2, with the population of 83.3 thousand people registered for 01.10.2013. According to the information on January 1, 2017, the population of the district was 86,529. 21,205 lived in the city, 65,0324 lived in the villages.

The region lives in 21,205 mini-cities, 65,324 mini-villages. The population of the region is 42 651 thousand men and 43 878 thousand women.

The number of people currently employed are 43481, as well as, the number of employees working in the agricultural sector are 17,856 people, employees working in the industry are 330 people, employees working in the education field are 3726.

77 families (223 people) from Nagorno-Karabakh and other territories temporarily settled in Aghstafa region. The total number of refugees settled in the region are 457 families, 1698 people.

According to the State Statistics Committee, as of 2018, the population of city recorded 87,200 persons, which increased by 12,700 persons (about 17 percent) from 74,500 persons in 2000. 43,000 of total population are men, 44,200 are women. More than 26,4 percent of the population (about 23,100 persons) consists of young people and teenagers aged 14–29.

Education 
There are 39 libraries, 13 culture houses, 1 musical school, 3 museums, 1 painting gallery and 25 clubs in the region. Central Hospital, 1 rural hospital, 15 rural health posts serve to the population of the district.

There are 39 schools, 4 pre-school and 34 kindergartens in the district.

Geographical position 
Aghstafa district was established on January 24, 1939, as one of the administrative districts of Azerbaijan. The Area of Aghstafa district, which is 1.74 of the territory of the Republic, is 1504 km2. The territory of the Aghstafa district joined the Gazakh district on December 4, 1959, and it was separated and became an administrative district from April 14, 1990.

There is one town (Aghstafa town), 9 settlements (Vurgun, Poylu, Shakarli, Jeyranchol, Saloglu, Soyuqbulag, Soyuqbulaglar, Hazi Aslanov, Garajazi) and 29 villages in the district.

The administrative center of the district is Aghstafa. The status of the city was given to Aghstafa in 1941. According to the 2017's information, the population of the city where located 300 meters above sea level on the right bank of Aghstafa River, is 86529 people. The distance from Baku is 450 km.

3,510 hectares of the district territory are covered with forests. The main part of the forests is Tugai forest. Covering a territory of 3,510 hectares, a number of plants and birds are protected in the Garayazi State Reserve, the names of which are listed in the IUCN Red List.

The region is located in the western part of Azerbaijan, on the border with Georgia and Armenia. The Kur River, the largest river in Azerbaijan, and the Kura branch - Aghstafachay, as well as several small rivers flow from this region. Candargol Lake is also located in this region. The surface of district mainly consist of plain such as Ganja-Gazakh and Garayazi plains. Sediments belonging to the Cretaceous, Paleogene, Quaternary are spread in the region. There are minerals such as saw stone, bentonite clay, pebble, sand, cement raw material, etc.

Tourism and historical monuments

Prehistoric monuments

 Paleolithic tent settlement(Paleolithic)- village Kochesker
 Open Palaeolithic tent(Paleolithic)- village Tatli
 Toyratepe settlement(neolith(late Stone Age)-Bronze Age)-village Ashagi Goychali
 1st Shomutepe settlement (neolith)-Aghstafa city
 Gargalar hill settlement (neolith)-village Girili
 Arzamastepe settlement (neolith)-settlement Vurgun
 Molla Nagi hill (Stone Age-neolith)-village Kochesker
 Kichik tepe settlement (Stone Age, neolith and Bronze Age)-village Ashagi Goyjali
 Chapiish settlement (eneolith-Bronze Age)-surrounding of Hasangulu river
 Chinlitepe settlement (eneolith)-village Tatli
 Ancient settlement and graveyard (choban dashi)(Bronze Age-Early Iron Age)-village Dagkesemen
 Jantepe settlement (Bronze Age)-Aghstafa city
 Sari gaznag graveyard (Bronze Age)- village Kochesker
 Alchagtepe settlement (Bronze Age-Iron Age)-village Tatli
 Alchagtepe settlement (Bronze Age)-village Tatli
 Gabagtepe settlement (Bronze Age-Iron Age)- village Pirili
 Yastitepe settlement (late Bronze Age)- Aghstafa city
 Durnatepe settlement (late Bronze Age-early Iron Age)- village Kochesker
 Boyuktepe settlement (late Bronze Age-early Iron Age)- village Kochesker
 Hasarlitepe settlement (late Bronze Age-early Iron Age)-village Yukhari Goyjali
 Saritepe settlement (late Bronze Age-early Iron Age)- village Yukhari Goyjali
 Goshatepe settlement (late Bronze Age-Iron Age)-village Yukhari Goyjali
 Hasarligala ancient settlement (late Bronze Age-Iron Age)-village Tatli
 2nd Shomutepe settlement (Bronze Age-early Iron Age)- village Yukhari Goyjali
 Nadir bey hill settlement (late Bronze Age)-village Hasansu
 Agalig tepesi settlement (late Bronze Age-early Iron Age)-Aghstafa-Gazakh highway
 Aranchi hill settlement (late Bronze Age- Iron Age)- Aghstafa-Dagkesemen highway
 Deyirmantepe settlement (late Bronze Age- early Middle Age)- Dagkesemen highway
 Agtepe settlement (late Bronze Age-antic period)-village Ashagi Goyjali
 Maraltepe settlement (late Bronze Age-antic period)- village Ashagi Goyjali
 Shish Guzey sacred place (Iron Age)- village Kochesker

Ancient to modern monuments
 The David Gareja monastery complex (Keşiş Dağ in Azerbaijani) is partially located in this region. However, access is on unpaved roads and, because the site is subject to a border dispute between Georgian and Azerbaijani authorities, visitors are treated with considerable suspicion.
 Nekropol (antic period)-village Pirili 
 Tatli Albanian temple (early Middle Ages)-between the villages Yukhari Goychali and Tatli
 Construction forked mountain air(middle age)- village Kochesker
 Settlement (4th-7th centuries)-village Dagkesemen
 Underground water-supply system(19th century)-village Kolkhalafli.

Notable natives 

Sabir Azeri (1938-2010) - Writer, author of best selling books.
Aslan Aslanov (1926–1995) - Doctor of philosophical sciences, the real member of the NA of the Republic of Azerbaijan, deserved scientific figure, rector of Azerbaijan State University of Arts (1977), the vice-president of the Azerbaijan Academy of Sciences and director of the Institute of Philosophy and Law(1988–1995).
Baba Mirzayev (1940-2006) - The National artist of the Azerbaijan Republic
Bayram Bayramov  (1935) - Candidate of technical sciences, owner of the order of "Glory", pensioner by the President, deserved rationalizer of Azerbaijan, the deputy of the chairman of Oil and Gas Extraction Office "Neft Dashlari" (from 1987).
Huseyn Arif (1924-1992) - poet
Ibrahim Rahimov (1849–1927) - The first psychiatrist-doctor of Azerbaijan.
Ilyas Abdullayev (1913) the academician of NA of Azerbaijan SSR, the deputy of the chairman of the Council of the Ministers of Azerbaijan SSR (1948–1950), Minister of Agriculture (1950–1953), the first deputy of the chairman of the Council of the Ministers (1954–1958), the chairman of Presidium of the Supreme Council of Azerbaijan SSR (1958–1959), the deputy of the Supreme Councils of USSR and Azerbaijan SSR.
Isa Huseynov (1928) - writer
Museyib Allahverdiyev (1909–1969)- Hero of the Soviet Union(1945), commander of detachment.
Nariman Hasanzade (1931) - poet
Nizami Jafarov (1954) - philologist
Nusrat Kasamanli (1946-2003) - poet
Samed aga Agamalioglu (1867–1930)-famous revolutionary, the first deputy of Azerbaijan CEC (1921), the chairman of CEC of Azerbaijan SSR, one of the chairmen of CEC of TSFSR (1922–1929), the chairman of the committee of All-Union New Turkish alphabet.
Suleyman Tatliyev (1925)-the chief of the department of the affairs at the Council of the Ministers (1970–1978), the 1st deputy of the chairman of the Council of the Ministers (1978–1985), the chairman of the Presidium of the Supreme Council of the Republic (1985–1989), the president of the House of Commerce and Industry of the Republic of Azerbaijan (from 1994), deputy of the Supreme Council of Azerbaijan SSR.
Vidadi Babanli (1927) - writer

References 

 
Districts of Azerbaijan